Thomas William Duncan (August 15, 1905 – September 15, 1987) was an American writer of circus novels, his most famous novel was Gus the Great (1947).

Born in Casey, Iowa, Duncan was educated at the Drake University and Harvard University.  He taught and worked as Director of Public Relations at Grinnell College (from 1942 to 1944).

He was married to Actea Carolyn Young.

He died at the age of 82, in Las Cruces, New Mexico, and was buried in an unmarked grave. His Wife, Actea, died three years later. Their graves were unmarked until July 22, 2015.

Novels
 O Chautauqua (1935)
 Ring Horse (1940)
 Gus the Great (1947)
 Big River, Big Man (1959)
 Virgo Descending (1961)
 The Labyrinth (1967)
 The Sky and Tomorrow (1974)

References

External links
 The Thomas W. Duncan Papers are housed at the University of Iowa Special Collections & University Archives.
 Jane Badger Books - Thomas W Duncan
 Thomas W. Duncan & “Gus the Great” by Donna Catterick

1905 births
1987 deaths
Drake University alumni
Harvard University alumni
20th-century American writers
20th-century American male writers